New Zealand competed at the 2018 Commonwealth Games in Gold Coast, Australia, from 4 to 15 April 2018. It was the nations's 21st appearance at the Commonwealth Games, having competed at every Games since their inception in 1930. The New Zealand team consisted of 251 athletes, 130 men and 121 women, across 17 sports.

The New Zealand team collected 46 medals: 15 gold, 16 silver and 15 bronze, an increase of one medal from the previous games. The medals came across twelve sports. The nation won its first medal in beach volleyball, which was introduced at the Games, and its first gold medal in hockey.

Medal tables

| width="78%" align="left" valign="top" |

|style="text-align:left;width:22%;vertical-align:top;"|

Competitors

| width=100% align=left valign=top |
The following is the list of number of competitors participating at the Games per sport/discipline.

Athletics

The NZOC announced fifteen athletes to compete at the games on 2 February 2018. Para-athlete Holly Robinson had been confirmed on 22 November 2017. Brothers Jake and Zane Robertson were added on 9 February 2018. Sprinter Joseph Millar was added on 23 February 2018. Siositina Hakeai was conditionally added on 28 February 2018. Zane Robertson withdrew from the team on 5 April 2018.

Men
Track & road

Field

Women
Track & road

Field

Badminton

Two badminton player were announced to compete at the games on 31 January 2018:

Basketball

New Zealand has qualified a men's and women's basketball teams for a total of 24 athletes (12 men and 12 women). The men's team qualified as being one of the top three teams in the Commonwealth (besides the host nation, Australia), while the women's team was invited by FIBA and the CGF.

Men's tournament

Roster

Tom Abercrombie
Finn Delany
Shea Ili
Jarrod Kenny
Rob Loe
Jordan Ngatai
Alex Pledger
Derone Raukawa
Ethan Rusbatch
Tohi Smith-Milner
Reuben Te Rangi
Mika Vukona (c)

Pool A

Semifinal

Bronze medal match

Women's tournament

Roster

Pool B

Qualifying final

Semifinal

Bronze medal match

Beach volleyball

The women's pair was named on 10 January 2018. The men's pair was added on 20 February 2018.

Boxing

The eight-member boxing team was announced on 22 February 2018.
 Men

Women

Cycling

The team of 33 cyclists was named on 17 February 2018. Jason Christie replaced Alex Frame, and Hayden McCormick replaced Hamish Bond in the road race, leaving Bond to focus solely on the time trial, on 22 March 2018.

Road
Men

Women

Track
Sprint

Keirin

Time trial

Pursuit

Points race

Scratch race

Mountain bike

Diving

New Zealand participated with a team of five athletes: two men and three women. Two divers were among selections announced on 22 December 2017, and three further divers were added to the squad on 16 February 2018.

Men

Women

Gymnastics

The first five gymnasts were announced on 22 December 2017. An additional two gymnasts were announced on 5 February 2018.

Artistic

Men
Team Final & Individual Qualification

Individual Finals

Women
Individual Qualification

Individual Finals

Rhythmic

Individual Qualification

Hockey

New Zealand has qualified both men's and women's hockey teams for a total of 36 athletes (18 men and 18 women). Both teams qualified as being one of the top nine teams in the Commonwealth (besides the host nation, Australia) according to their FIH World Rankings as of 31 October 2017.

Men's tournament

Roster

Cory Bennett
Marcus Child
Hugo Inglis
Stephen Jenness
Richard Joyce
Dane Lett
Devon Manchester
Shea McAleese
Harry Miskimmin
George Muir
Dominic Newman
Arun Panchia (c)
Jared Panchia
Hayden Phillips
Nick Ross
Kane Russell
Aidan Sarikaya
Nic Woods

Pool A

Semifinal

Gold medal match

Women's tournament

Roster

Sam Charlton
Tarryn Davey
Frances Davies
Madison Doar
Shiloh Gloyn
Ella Gunson
Sam Harrison
Pippa Hayward
Rose Keddell
Anita McLaren
Olivia Merry
Stacey Michelsen (c)
Brooke Neal
Grace O'Hanlon
Amy Robinson
Sally Rutherford
Kelsey Smith
Liz Thompson

Pool B

Semifinal

Gold medal match

Lawn bowls

The NZOC named seven para-bowlers to compete at the games on 22 November 2017. with the ten able-bodied bowlers named in January 2018.
Men

Women

Para

Netball

New Zealand qualified a netball team by virtue of being ranked in the top 11 (excluding the host nation, Australia) of the INF World Rankings on 1 July 2017. The team was announced on 8 February 2018.

Roster

Katrina Grant (c)
Maria Folau (vc)
Ameliaranne Ekenasio
Temalisi Fakahokotau
Shannon Francois
Kelly Jury
Grace Kara
Claire Kersten
Bailey Mes
Te Paea Selby-Rickit
Michaela Sokolich-Beatson
Samantha Sinclair

Pool B

Semifinal

Bronze medal match

Rugby sevens

The New Zealand men's side qualified due to their 2016–17 World Rugby Sevens Series ranking, while the New Zealand women's side qualified due to their 2016–17 World Rugby Women's Sevens Series ranking. Both the men's and women's teams were announced on 21 March 2018.

Men's tournament

Team

Kurt Baker
Dylan Collier
Scott Curry
Sam Dickson
Trael Joass
Vilimoni Koroi
Andrew Knewstubb
Tim Mikkelson
 Sione Molia
Etene Nanai-Seturo
Akuila Rokolisoa
Regan Ware

Travelling reserve: Teddy Stanaway

Pool B

Semifinal

Gold medal match

Women's tournament

Team

Shakira Baker
Michaela Blyde
Kelly Brazier
Gayle Broughton
Theresa Fitzpatrick
Sarah Goss
Tyla Nathan-Wong
Alena Saili
Stacey Waaka
Niall Williams
Tenika Willison
Portia Woodman

Travelling reserve: Risi Pouri-Lane

Pool A

Semifinal

Gold medal match

Shooting

The NZOC announced eleven shooters to compete at the Games on 17 January 2018.

Nomination criteria:

Men

Women

Open
Queen's Prize (full bore)

Squash

The seven-member squash team was announced on 7 February 2018.
Individual

Doubles

Swimming

The New Zealand swimming selections were announced on 22 December 2017, with Lewis Clareburt added to the squad on 15 February 2018.

Men

Women

Triathlon

The NZOC announced five triathletes to compete at the games on 9 November 2017. Tony Dodds was added on 14 February 2018.

Individual

Mixed relay

Weightlifting

The NZOC announced twelve weightlifters to compete at the Games on 24 November 2017.

Nomination criteria:

Men

Women

Wrestling

The seven-member wrestling team was announced on 21 February 2018.

Repechage format

Group stage format

Nordic format

References

2018
Commonwealth Games
Nations at the 2018 Commonwealth Games